Farsh Ara Mashhad Futsal Club (Bashgah-e Futsal-e Fersh-e Âra Mishhed) is an Iranian professional Futsal club based in Mashhad.

Season to season

The table below chronicles the achievements of the Club in various competitions.

Last updated: 12 March 2022

Players

Current squad

Notable players

Personnel

Current technical staff

Last updated: 9 November 2022

Club officials

Last updated: 9 November 2022

References

External links
 
 Farsh Ara's Stats and History in PersianLeague

Futsal clubs in Iran
Sport in Mashhad
1994 establishments in Iran
Futsal clubs established in 1994